The sternohyoid muscle is a thin, narrow muscle attaching the hyoid bone to the sternum. It is one of the paired strap muscles of the infrahyoid muscles. It is supplied by the ansa cervicalis. It depresses the hyoid bone.

Structure 
The sternohyoid muscle is one of the paired strap muscles of the infrahyoid muscles. It arises from the posterior border of the medial end of the clavicle, the posterior sternoclavicular ligament, and the upper and posterior part of the manubrium of the sternum. Passing upward and medially, it is inserted by short tendinous fibers into the lower border of the body of the hyoid bone. It runs lateral to the trachea.

Nerve supply 
The sternohyoid muscle is supplied by a branch of the ansa cervicalis.

Variations
The sternohyoid muscle may be doubled, have accessory slips (Cleidohyoideus) or be completely absent in some people.

It sometimes presents a transverse tendinous inscription immediately above its origin.

Function 
The sternohyoid muscle performs a number of functions:

 depresses the hyoid bone.
 helps with speech, primarily to do with volume rather than intonation.
 helps to move the head and neck.

Additional images

References

External links
  - "Nerves and Vessels of the Carotid triangle"
 PTCentral

Muscles of the head and neck